Survivor 2017 was the fifth season of Survivor Greece, the Greek version of the popular reality show Survivor. The Game started airing on Skai TV on February 13, 2017 in Greece and in Cyprus it started airing the same day on Sigma TV. It is hosted by Sakis Tanimanidis and two episodes were hosted by the Turkish producer of the Greek version of Survivor, Acun Ilıcalı. It is also being broadcast abroad via SKAI's international stations. Twelve players and twelve celebrities have been known in Greece through their work are invited to survive on a deserted island, the exotic Dominican Republic, for 5 months, having their luggage, the necessary clothes and basic food supply. On episode 77, the last team match took place and on episode 78, individual matches started. Immunity matches after episode 80 will be held twice a week. Also, the tribe merge held in episode 44, but individual matches started in episode 78. The Finals were held on 3, 4 & 5 July live in the open theatre of Alsos Veikou, Galatsi, Athens. The winner of season five was Giorgos Angelopoulos from the team "Celebrities" (Διάσημοι).

Contestants
The names of the original tribes were Mαχητές (Machites, meaning warriors), and Διάσημοι (Diasimoi, meaning celebrities).

Voting history

Nominations table

Results of the finals 
Color key
Result details

Team matches

Individual matches 
In the individual matches, the winner has the ability to choose two players to enjoy the reward with him/her, except the immunities.

Finals

Ratings

References

2017 Greek television seasons
05
Television shows filmed in the Dominican Republic